Huanghuachangoceras is a discsorid genus from the Upper Ordovician of China.

References

Huanghuachangoceras in fossilworks.
J. Sepkoski's online line of cephalopod genera

Discosorida